WTSR (91.3 FM) is a non-commercial radio station broadcasting from The College of New Jersey (formerly Trenton State College), servicing Mercer County and Bucks County, Pennsylvania, as well as broadcasting over the internet. The station's call letters originally stood the college's former name: W Trenton State Radio.

History
WTSR first went on the air in September 1966. Originally broadcasting on 89.7 FM at a power of 10 watts, the frequency was changed to 91.3 in 1972 when the station was granted an increase in power by the FCC to broadcast at 1,500 watts. This upgrade provided the station with a 30-mile broadcast radius and the capability to reach a potential audience of 750,000-800,000 listeners. During the mid-1980s the station was part of the WWDE or 2WD Family until another split helped move it to its current place. WTSR moved into brand new facilities inside Kendall Hall at the beginning of the 1993–94 academic year. The station began broadcasting over the internet in late February 2007.

Programming
The station features a mix of indie music, rock, and specialty programming. Its official music format is "new alternative variety". Between 7:00am and 6:00pm the station features its "Dayside" programming, which is designed to help promote up-and-coming artists as well as provide a home to bands not often heard on commercial radio. The introduction of the "Dayside" format in 1996 helped bring the station notoriety amongst the college radio community and establish it as one of the more influential stations in the college radio ranks. The music sent to the station is sorted and some are placed in the "highs", or music that is in high demand by promoters (often bands who have a small following or are just getting started, etc.). After a few weeks in the highs, the albums are then moved in to the "lows" and eventually to the "backwall". In any given "Dayside" show, DJs are required to play a variety of "highs", "lows", "backwalls" and "opens" (any album already in the station). This format promotes music that is generally not played on other non-college radio stations. This is what led to the station's slogan, "Open Your Mind".

Between 6:00pm and midnight, the station offers a variety of specialty programming that consists of shows featuring folk/world, synth-pop, modern rock, metal, reggae, oldies, gospel, and many more. The show lineup changes every semester depending on student DJs and Community Volunteers.

Charting
WTSR reports Top 30 and Loud Rock charts weekly to CMJ as well as being part of the magazine's select group of "Core Reporters". Previously WTSR reported charts to Gavin Magazine before that publication's demise in 2002.

Management
WTSR is completely student-run consisting of two boards: the Executive Board (e-board) and the Board of Directors. The e-board is made up of the Station Manager, Operations Manager, and the Program Manager. The Board of Directors includes the rest of the board, for a total of 12 student members who run the station along with the General Manager.

References

External links 
 

TSR
Radio stations established in 1966